Udmaru is a village in the Leh district of Ladakh, India. It is located in the Nubra tehsil, on the banks of Shyok River.

Demographics 
According to the 2011 census of India, Udmaru has 84 households. The effective literacy rate (i.e. the literacy rate of population excluding children aged 6 and below) is 50.29%.

References

Villages in Nubra tehsil